The canton of Dinard is a former canton of France, located in the arrondissement of Saint-Malo, in the Ille-et-Vilaine département, Brittany région. It had 24,417 inhabitants (2012). It was disbanded following the French canton reorganisation which came into effect in March 2015. It consisted of 6 communes, which joined the canton of Saint-Malo-2 in 2015.

Composition
The canton comprised the following communes:
 Dinard
 Le Minihic-sur-Rance
 Pleurtuit
 La Richardais
 Saint-Briac-sur-Mer
 Saint-Lunaire

Election results

2008

2001

References

Former cantons of Ille-et-Vilaine
2015 disestablishments in France
States and territories disestablished in 2015